Inhumanity is the debut album of Finnish melodic death metal band Mors Principium Est. It was first released in 2003 and later reissued in 2006 with new artwork and three bonus tracks.

Track listing

Original 2003 release

2006 re-release bonus tracks

Personnel

Musicians
 Jori Haukio – guitars
 Ville Viljanen – vocals
 Jarkko Kokko – guitars
 Mikko Sipola – drums
 Teemu Heinola – bass
 Toni Nummelin – keyboards

Others
 Ahti Kortelainen – recording and mixing
 Mika Jussila – mastering
 Mors Principium Est – production
 Markus Niinisalo – artwork and photography

References

2003 debut albums
Mors Principium Est albums